The Armada is a popular history by Garrett Mattingly—a historian who taught at Columbia University—about the attempt of the Spanish Armada to invade England in 1588. It was published in 1959 by Houghton Mifflin Company, and Mattingly won a special Pulitzer Prize for the work in 1960 as "a first class history and a literary work of high order."

One biographer wrote that The Armada was "written in purple prose but a royal purple, which read like historical fiction." Another biographer noted that Mattingly "treated his job as that of telling a story about people" and that The Armada was "that rarity, a book by a professional historian and admired by professional historians which nevertheless became a best seller." The Armada remains in print and has also been issued outside the United States under the title The Defeat of the Spanish Armada.

References

1959 non-fiction books
20th-century history books
Books about military history
History books about England
History books about Spain
History books about the 16th century
Pulitzer Prize-winning works